Madness or The Madness may refer to:

Emotion and mental health
 Anger, an intense emotional response to a perceived provocation, hurt or threat
 Insanity, a spectrum of behaviors characterized by certain abnormal mental or behavioral patterns
 Mental disorder, a diagnosis of a behavioral or mental pattern that may cause suffering or poor ability to function

Film and television
 Madness (1919 film), a German horror film directed by Conrad Veidt
 Madness (1980 film), an Italian crime-drama film directed by Fernando Di Leo
 Madness (1992 film), an Italian giallo film directed by Bruno Mattei
 Madness (2010 film), a Swedish horror film
 "Madness" (Dynasty), a 1983 television episode

Music 
 Madness (band), a British ska/pop band formed in 1976
 The Madness (band), a 1988–1989 incarnation of Madness

Albums 
 Madness (All That Remains album) or the title song, 2017
 Madness (Guy Sebastian album) or the title song, 2014
 Madness (Madness album), 1983
 Madness (Sleeping with Sirens album) or the title song, 2015
 Madness (Tony MacAlpine album), 1993
 Madness, by Sarah McLeod, 2010
 The Madness (Art of Anarchy album) or the title song, 2017
 The Madness (The Madness album), 1988

Songs 
 "Madness" (Elton John song), 1978
 "Madness" (Ivi Adamou song), 2012
 "Madness" (Muse song), 2012
 "Madness (Is All in the Mind)", by Madness, 1983 (for the Prince Buster song recorded by Madness in 1979, see below)
 "Madness", by Alanis Morissette from Flavors of Entanglement, 2008
 "Madness", by Battle Beast from Unholy Savior, 2015
 "Madness", by Cascada, 2014
 "Madness", by KSI from All Over the Place, 2021
 "Madness", by Mist, 2016
 "Madness", by Prince Buster from I Feel the Spirit, 1963
 "Madness", by the Rasmus from Into, 2001

Other uses 
 Madness (Magic: The Gathering), a keyword in the trading card game Magic: The Gathering
 Madness (manga), a 2004 Japanese yaoi and adventure manga series by Kairi Shimotsuki
 MADNESS (Multiresolution Adaptive Numerical Environment for Scientific Simulation), a software environment for numerical simulation
 Michigan Madness, a defunct soccer club based in Ann Arbor, Michigan, US
 Madness, the English name of the goddess of insanity in the tragedy Herakles by Euripides

See also
 
 Mad (disambiguation)